Edward John Dunn (1 November 1844 – 20 April 1937) was an English-born Australian geologist, winner of the 1905 Murchison Medal.

Early life
Dunn was born at Bedminster near Bristol, England, the son of Edward Herbert Dunn and Betsy Robinson Dunn. The family emigrated to New South Wales in 1849, initially living near Goulburn, New South Wales then in Beechworth, Victoria from 1856. Dunn was educated at the Beechworth Church of England school and later by a tutor. Dunn was a collector of rocks and minerals from boyhood.

Geological career
Dunn entered the Beechworth land survey office and had experience in surveying. In 1864 he joined the geological survey under Alfred Richard Cecil Selwyn and was trained in geological work by Georg Heinrich Friedrich Ulrich. He remained with the survey until it was abolished in 1869; in that year he became qualified as a mining surveyor.

In 1871 Dunn returned to England, via South Africa, where he was government geologist for the Cape Colony reporting on mines. He prepared the first geological map of South Africa and had a part in the discovery of diamonds. In 1872 Dunn travelled through Bushmanland accompanied by 15 troopers of the Northern Border police. He gathered much information about the Bushmen which he embodied in his work on The Bushman, which, however, was not published until nearly 60 years later. In 1873 he went to London, studied at the school of mines, Jermyn Street, and obtained his certificate for assaying. In 1883 he predicted that the Transvaal would become an infinitely richer gold-bearing country than any yet discovered.

Dunn returned to Victoria in 1886 and went into private practice. As a result of one of his reports the coalfield at Korumburra, Victoria, was developed. Dunn was appointed director of the geological survey of Victoria in 1904, and in 1905 was awarded the Murchison Medal by the Geological Society of London. Dunn used the award money to publish his monograph on Pebbles, which appeared in 1911. Dunn was elected President of the Royal Society of Victoria in 1906. He retired from the Geological Survey of Victoria in 1912, but kept up his interest in his subject through an energetic old age.

During his lifetime Dunn built up a substantial library of books. As well as Australiana, he had many books on geology, anthropology and natural history.

Late life
At age 84, Dunn published a comprehensive work on the Geology of Gold (1929); his book on The Bushman, based on his South Africa experience, came out two years later. Dunn died on 20 April 1937. He married in 1875 Elizabeth Julie Perchard who survived him with a son and two daughters. A list of his publications can be found in In Memory of Edward John Dunn, Melbourne, 1937. His collection of Bushmen objects was given to the Pitt Rivers museum at Oxford, his australites and pebbles went to the British Museum, and his collection of Victorian stones were bequeathed to the mines department museum, Melbourne.

References

A. W. Beasley, 'Dunn, Edward John (1844 - 1937)', Australian Dictionary of Biography, Volume 8, MUP, 1981, pp 372–373. Retrieved 5 October 2008

Dunn, Edward John (1844 - 1937) Bright Sparcs, University of Melbourne. Retrieved 5 October 2008

1844 births
1937 deaths
Australian geologists
Australian people of English descent
Australian book and manuscript collectors